The AN/AAR-47 Missile Warning System is a Missile Approach Warning system used on slow moving aircraft such as helicopters and military transport aircraft to notify the pilot of threats and to trigger the aircraft's countermeasures systems. Its main users are the U.S. Army, Navy and Air Force, but is also operated by other countries. Originally developed by Loral (now part of BAE Systems), and later dual-source procured from Loral Infrared & Imaging Systems and Honeywell Electro-Optics Div., both in Lexington, MA, it has been a product of Alliant Techsystems (ATK) since 2002. 100 to 300 sets have been manufactured per annum.

Operation
The AN/AAR-47 passively detects missiles by their infrared signature, and uses algorithms to differentiate between incoming missiles and false alarms. Newer versions also have laser warning sensors and are capable of detecting a wider range of threats. After processing the nature of the threat, the system gives the pilot an audio and visual warning, and indicates the direction of the incoming threat. It also sends a signal to the aircraft's infrared countermeasures system, which can then for example deploy flares.

The system's algorithms include looking for temporal variations in a signal's strength, such as the brightening of an incoming missile. It also evaluates the spectral bandpass of the threat to reduce false alarms and has software for detecting events, such as the launch of a surface-to-air missile.

History
The AN/AAR-47 is a line of missile warning systems by Loral and ATK Alliant Techsystems. The development of the original AN/AAR-47(V)1 began in 1983 by Loral. ATK became a second production source in the mid 90s and eventually became the prime contractor. In 1998 ATK began production of the improved AN/AAR-47(V)2 version, which added laser warning functionality. As of 2005, over 5000 of these sets have been manufactured. In 2006, production of the AN/AAR-47A(V)2 began, also developed by ATK. It has further improved missile and laser warning capabilities.

A further developed model, AAR-47B(V)2, reached initial operating capability in 2008. It adds Hostile Fire Indication (HFI), which is the ability to detect incoming rocket-propelled grenades and tracer ammunition in addition to an overall improvement in missile detection. The U.S. Navy placed orders for over 1600 in 2009.

Components
The AAR-47 missile warning system consists of 4 Optical Sensor Converters (OSC), a Computer Processor and a Control Indicator. The system is relatively light at a total weight of approximately 32 pounds.

There is one optical sensor converter for each side of the aircraft. They have an infrared camera for detecting incoming missiles. The Optical modules since version AAR-47(V)2 include a laser warning sensor, and versions since AAR-47A(V)2 further incorporate an ultraviolet sensor for improved dynamic blanking laser warning detection.

The computer processor evaluates the data from the OSC:s and analyzes whether a detected event is an incoming missile. If a threat is detected, it sends a signal to the control indicator which informs the crew, and the aircraft's infrared countermeasures system.

Versions
AN/AAR-47(V)1 Original version providing missile warning with IR detectors.
AN/AAR-47(V)2 Adds laser warning sensors to the optical sensor modules and extends temperature operation range and operational life.
AN/AAR-47A(V)2 Adds UV detectors, increases detection sensitivity and extends temperature operation range and operational life.
AN/AAR-47B(V)2 Has improved detection performance, clutter detection, and is capable of detecting RPG:s and incoming fire using tracer ammunition. The OSC:s are identical to 47A(V)2.

Users
U.S. Army
U.S. Air Force
U.S. Navy
NATO
Indian Air Force- AN/AAR-47B(V)2 on order
Other militaries

References

External links 

http://www.globalsecurity.org/military/systems/aircraft/systems/an-aar-47.htm

Electronic warfare equipment
Military electronics of the United States
Alliant Techsystems
Equipment of the United States Air Force
Northrop Grumman
Military equipment introduced in the 1980s